The Brighton Bathing Boxes are 88 beach huts on Dendy Street Beach in Brighton, Victoria, Australia, in the City of Bayside. They are a significant tourist attraction for the area.

Construction 
The Brighton Bathing Boxes are built in a uniform way with Victorian features, painted weatherboards and corrugated iron roof, due to a Planning Scheme Heritage Overlay. Owners are allowed to paint their huts, causing a mass of different bright colours. They do not have water or electricity connections.

History 
The Brighton Bathing Boxes were first built in the 1860s, across the Brighton coastline, to protect the modesty of bathers. In 1934, bathing boxes on other beaches were moved to Dendy Street Beach, and to the top of the beach, instead of the high-water mark, where they were located previously. In 1983, the Coastal Caucus Committee decided to phase out 2000 buildings along the Port Phillip Bay, including the Brighton Bathing Boxes. Among others, the Brighton Bathing Box Association decided to fight the decision, and in 1985, the Bathing Boxes were recommended for retention, with the huts being heritage-listed in 2000.

In 2009, the City of Bayside built 9 more huts at the southern end of the beach to raise money in light of the Global Financial Crisis, raising the number to 88. This was done despite the objections of heritage groups, as boxes previously built there had flooded.

In 2019, the Draft Marine and Coastal Policy document proposed that the huts be removed or relocated, causing backlash online and condemnation from the Victorian Liberal Party and Member for Brighton James Newbury, with Newbury calling the plan 'crazy'. Acting Premier Lisa Neville accusing Newbury of fearmongering, stating, “This is a nonsense coming from the Liberal Party.”

Erosion 
The Brighton Bathing Boxes are at threat of erosion, which has caused sandbags to be installed, in order to stop flooding. Sand has also been trucked in, in an attempt to stop erosion and replenish sand on the beach.

References 

Culture of Melbourne
Buildings and structures in the City of Bayside
Tourist attractions in Melbourne
Heritage-listed buildings in Melbourne
1860s establishments in Australia
Buildings and structures completed in the 1860s